This is a comprehensive list of every song recorded by the American pop rock band Imagine Dragons. This includes singles, covers, soundtrack songs, collaborations, and unreleased songs.

List of songs

Unreleased songs

References

Imagine Dragons